Robert Smith Willis (31 January 1901 – 1974) was an English footballer who played as a wing half for Rochdale and Halifax Town

References

Rochdale A.F.C. players
Halifax Town A.F.C. players
Shankhouse F.C. players
Leeds City F.C. players
Blyth Spartans A.F.C. players
Dundee F.C. players
English footballers
1901 births
1974 deaths
People from Cramlington
Footballers from Northumberland
Association footballers not categorized by position